Iana Bernardez (born 1993) is a Filipino film producer and actress known for her production work on films such as Kiko Boksingero, Oda Sa Wala, Tia Madre, and Babae at Baril and for her critically acclaimed film acting debut in the 2018 film Gusto Kita with All My Hypothalamus. She also won Best Supporting Actress at the 2019 Cinema One Originals Digital Film Festival for the 2019 film Metamorphosis.  She is the daughter of Filipina actress Angel Aquino.

Production work 
Bernardez began her career in production, having become curious about her work through her interactions on the sets of projects where her mother acted. She continues to see herself primarily as a producer rather than an actress. Her early production work on films like films such as "Kiko Boksingero" and Babae at Baril received critical acclaim. The latter was eventually awarded Best film at the 43rd Gawad Urian Awards in 2020.

Acting work 
Her acting debut in Gusto Kita with All My Hypothalamus was a major role which she got despite originally joining the film as a talent coordinator.  When other members of the production realized who she was, and that the concept for the character was "a younger" version of Bernardez' own mother, they encouraged her to apply for the role. Because of her production background, Bernardez often volunteered at first to take on extra roles for minimum pay in the films she served as producer in, to help reduce those productions' costs. She had to be reminded by her mother that she should stop this practice, since she already had significant acting experience.

She received the Cinema One Originals Best Supporting Actress award in 2019 for Metamorphosis, an intersex coming of age story which had nearly been given an X rating by the Philippines' Movie and Television Review and Classification Board (MTRCB), which only agreed to give the film an R-16 rating after an appeal.

Personal life 
Bernardez is the daughter of Filipina actress Angel Aquino.

References 

1993 births
Living people
21st-century Filipino actresses
Filipino film producers